Ukraine participated at the 2017 Summer Universiade in Taipei, Taiwan. 160 Ukrainian athletes competed in archery, athletics, basketball, diving, fencing, football, gymnastics, judo, swimming, taekwondo, volleyball, weightlifting, and wushu. Ukraine was not represented in badminton, baseball, billiards, golf, roller sports, table tennis, tennis, and water polo. The team won 36 medals, 12 of which were gold, and finished 6th.

Medal summary

Medal by sports

Medalists

See also
 Ukraine at the 2017 Winter Universiade

References

External links
 Universiade Taipei 2017
 Ukraine Overview

Nations at the 2017 Summer Universiade
2017
2017 in Ukrainian sport